Bontempelli is an Italian surname. Notable people with the surname include:

Marcus Bontempelli (born 1995), Australian rules footballer
Massimo Bontempelli (1878–1960), Italian poet, playwright, novelist, and composer

Italian-language surnames